Soviet repression of Poles may refer to:
 Polish Operation of the NKVD (1937–38)
 Soviet repressions of Polish citizens (1939–1946) 
 Katyn massacre, a series of mass executions of Polish officers carried out by the Soviet Union